RCCA may refer to:

 RCCA security, in cryptography
 Revolutionary Communist Cell of Afghanistan, see Communist (Maoist) Party of Afghanistan
 Roller Coaster Corporation of America
 Ross Corners Christian Academy, a school in Vestal, New York

See also
 RCA (disambiguation)